Troup County (pronounced  ) is a county located in the west central portion of the U.S. state of Georgia. As of the 2020 census, the population was 69,426. The county seat is LaGrange.

Troup County comprises the LaGrange, GA Micropolitan Statistical Area along with Chambers County, AL. It is included in the Atlanta-Athens-Clarke County-Sandy Springs, GA Combined Statistical Area.

History
For thousands of years, this area of what is now defined as west central Georgia was occupied by cultures of indigenous peoples. In the historic period, it was part of a large area controlled by the Muscogee, also known as the Creek people.

The land for Lee, Muscogee, Troup, Coweta, and Carroll counties was ceded by the Creek to the United States in the 1825 Treaty of Indian Springs.  The counties' boundaries were created by the Georgia General Assembly on June 9, 1826, but the counties themselves were not named until December 14, 1826.

The county is named for George Troup, thirty-fourth governor of Georgia, U.S. representative, and senator.

As with much of the Piedmont, this area was developed in the antebellum era for cotton cultivation after short-staple cotton was made profitable by invention of the cotton gin. By 1860 Troup County was the fourth-wealthiest in Georgia and fifth-largest slaveholding county in the state.

According to U.S. Census data, the 1860 Troup County population included 6,223 whites, 37 "free colored" and 10,002 slaves. By the 1870 census, the white population had increased about 3% to 6,408, while the "colored" population had increased about 12% to 11,224.

During the post-Reconstruction period, violence and the number of lynchings of blacks increased in the late 19th century, as whites exercised terrorism to re-establish and maintain white supremacy. Whites lynched three African Americans in Troup County in this period, most were killed around the turn of the 20th century. Such deaths occurred through the post-World War II period. A fourth man from Troup County was lynched in neighboring Harris County.

In the late 19th century, entrepreneurs in LaGrange built the first cotton mill, and others were rapidly established in this area. Initially they employed only white workers.

20th century to present
During the first half of the 20th century, thousands of blacks left Georgia and other southern states in what is known as the Great Migration. They were seeking work as mechanization reduced the number of farm jobs, and they were seeking more opportunities than in the Jim Crow South, where they were disenfranchised and socially oppressed.

On September 8, 1940, 16-year-old Austin Callaway, a black youth, was arrested in LaGrange as a suspect in an attack on a white woman. The next night a small, armed group of white men took him from the county jail, driving him out to the nearby countryside, where they lynched him: shooting him several times and leaving him for dead. In 2017 a man who was a child at the time revealed that his white family found and took Callaway to the hospital, where he died the next day. They had kept their role secret out of fear of the KKK. Callaway was noted by the local paper as dying from gunshot wounds; the New York Times at the time described it as a lynching. As was typical in these cases, no one was prosecuted for the murder. In response, that fall African Americans organized the first NAACP chapter in Troup County at Warren Temple Methodist Church in LaGrange. It has worked on a variety of civil rights issues, including voting rights, equal justice, access, and human services.

In 1947, prosperous farmer Henry "Peg" Gilbert, a married African-American father who owned and farmed 100 acres in the county, was arrested and charged with harboring a fugitive by officials from neighboring Harris County, Georgia, in the case of Gus Davidson. Also African American, the latter man was charged in the shooting death of a white farmer. Four days later Gilbert was dead, shot while held in jail by the Harris County Sheriff, in what he said was self-defense. In 2016 the Civil Rights and Restorative Justice Project of Northeastern University reported on this death in custody. They found that Gilbert had been beaten severely before his death, and shot five times. They asserted he had been detained and killed because of his success as a farmer.

By 1960, the county was recorded in the US Census as having 31,418 whites and 15,760 "Negroes" (now classified as black or African Americans). Following passage of the Voting Rights Act of 1965, blacks gradually regained the ability to vote and take part in the political process.

Textile manufacturing was a major part of the economy until the late 20th century, when textile manufacturing moved offshore to areas with cheaper labor. The county has acquired other industry, notably auto parts manufacturers who support the nearby Kia Motors plant. Also in the area are West Point Lake and Callaway Gardens, which attract tourists and visitors as top recreation destinations in the state.

As of 2015, the official historian of Troup County is writer Forrest Clark Johnson, III, who has published several books on the county and region's history. He is a retired teacher in the county's school system.

On January 25, 2017, Mayor Jim Thornton and Police Chief Louis M. Dekmar, of the county seat of LaGrange, publicly apologized to more than 200 people gathered for a reconciliation service at Warren Temple United Methodist Church for the police's failure decades before to protect Callaway, saying:

"I sincerely regret and denounce the role our Police Department played in Austin's lynching, both through our action and our inaction," Chief Dekmar told a crowd at a traditionally African-American church. "And for that, I'm profoundly sorry. It should never have happened."

Residents organized Troup Together, a grassroots group to acknowledge lynchings, commemorate the victims, and work on racial reconciliation. On March 18, 2017, black and white residents of the county gathered to dedicate a historic marker at Warren Temple Church "memorializing Callaway's lynching and three others documented in the area: Willis Hodnett in 1884; Samuel Owensby in 1913 and Henry Gilbert, a Troup County resident who was lynched in neighboring Harris County in 1947." Another ceremony was held at Southview Cemetery in LaGrange, where these names were read.

On April 7, 2017, Troup County's computer systems were the victim of a ransomware attack; it caused all county computer systems to be inaccessible.  This included the sheriff's office and district attorney's office.  After 5 days, the county was still working to get 400 computer systems back online.

Government
The government of Troup County is based on an elected county commission, or council. The chairman is elected county-wide, or at-large, and four commissioners are each elected from single-member districts. District 5 includes much of the territory of LaGrange, the county seat and most densely settled community in the county.

Politics

Geography
The county is located in the Piedmont region of the state.

The entirety of Troup County is located in the Middle Chattahoochee River-Lake Harding sub-basin of the ACF River Basin (Apalachicola-Chattahoochee-Flint River Basin).

Major highways

  Interstate 85
  Interstate 185
  U.S. Route 27
  U.S. Route 29
  State Route 1
  State Route 14
  State Route 14 Connector
  State Route 14 Spur
  State Route 18
  State Route 54
  State Route 100
  State Route 103
  State Route 109
  State Route 219
  State Route 403 (unsigned designation for I-85)
  State Route 411 (unsigned designation for I-185)

Adjacent counties
 Coweta County (northeast)
 Meriwether County (east)
 Harris County (south)
 Chambers County, Alabama (southwest/CST Border except for Lanett and Valley as they are part of the Columbus Metropolitan Area)
 Randolph County, Alabama (northwest/CST Border)
 Heard County (north)

Demographics

2000 census
As of the census of 2000, there were 58,779 people, 21,920 households, and 15,607 families residing in the county. There were 23,824 housing units at an average density of 58 per square mile (22/km2). The racial makeup of the county was 65.80% White, 31.87% Black or African American, 0.16% Native American, 0.58% Asian, 0.06% Pacific Islander, 0.75% from other races, and 0.78% from two or more races.  1.71% of the population were Hispanic or Latino of any race.

There were 21,920 households, out of which 34.60% had children under the age of 18 living with them, 49.10% were married couples living together, 17.90% had a female householder with no husband present, and 28.80% were non-families. 24.90% of all households were made up of individuals, and 10.20% had someone living alone who was 65 years of age or older.  The average household size was 2.61 and the average family size was 3.12.

In the county, the population was spread out, with 27.90% under the age of 18, 9.20% from 18 to 24, 28.40% from 25 to 44, 21.90% from 45 to 64, and 12.60% who were 65 years of age or older.  The median age was 35 years. For every 100 females, there were 91.00 males.  For every 100 females age 18 and over, there were 86.70 males.

The median income for a household in the county was $35,469, and the median income for a family was $41,891. Males had a median income of $31,863 versus $22,393 for females. The per capita income for the county was $17,626.  About 12.20% of families and 14.80% of the population were below the poverty line, including 20.70% of those under age 18 and 14.00% of those age 65 or over.

2010 census
As of the 2010 United States Census, there were 67,044 people, 24,828 households, and 17,489 families residing in the county. The racial makeup of the county was 61.5% white, 33.4% black or African American, 1.6% Asian, 0.3% American Indian, 0.1% Pacific islander, 1.7% from other races, and 1.5% from two or more races. Those of Hispanic or Latino origin made up 3.2% of the population. In terms of ancestry, 12.3% were English, 12.1% were American, 11.4% were Irish, and 7.3% were German.

Of the 24,828 households, 37.9% had children under the age of 18 living with them, 45.0% were married couples living together, 20.3% had a female householder with no husband present, 29.6% were non-families, and 25.1% of all households were made up of individuals. The average household size was 2.62 and the average family size was 3.12. The median age was 36.3 years.

The median income for a household in the county was $41,770 and the median income for a family was $50,625. Males had a median income of $39,960 versus $28,218 for females. The per capita income for the county was $19,699. About 15.5% of families and 19.8% of the population were below the poverty line, including 30.1% of those under age 18 and 14.2% of those age 65 or over.

2020 census

As of the 2020 United States census, there were 69,426 people, 24,436 households, and 15,354 families residing in the county.

Communities
 Harrisonville
 Hogansville
 LaGrange (county seat)
 Long Cane
 Mountville
 West Point

See also

 National Register of Historic Places listings in Troup County, Georgia
 The Burnt Village
List of counties in Georgia

References 

 
Georgia (U.S. state) counties
1826 establishments in Georgia (U.S. state)
Populated places established in 1826